Francesco Maria Torrigio (1580 – 1649) was an Italian ecclesiastical historian and erudite scholar.

Torrigio was born in Rome, ordained, and became a canon in the church of San Nicola in Carcere. He participated and wrote about the 1615 inspection and exhumation of tombs in the crypt of St Peter's Basilica. This apparently proceeded under the supervision of the archpriest of St Peter's, Giovanni Evangelista Cardinal Pallotta. One of the sarcophagi had the lettering Linus and was attributed to belong to St Linus (pope from AD 67-76). However, later scholars have surmised that these were only a portion of a longer name, for example Aquilinus. Vatican scholars of the time sought physical evidence that the papacy was linked to St Peter's since the first century.

Works 
The publications of Torrigio, include:

 Note: refers to Theodore Tiron of Amasya.
 Note: overlaps with Le Sacre Grotte.

 Note: refers to icon in Santi Domenico e Sisto.

References

1580 births
1649 deaths
17th-century Italian historians
17th-century Italian male writers